Bain de Soleil was a brand of sunscreen that was produced by Bayer. It was affiliated with the Coppertone brand. The name Bain de Soleil is French for "sun bathing." The brand used the slogan "Welcome to a place more colorful." In the 1970s and 1980s, the brand used the slogan (especially featured in television commercials) "Bain de Soleil, for the St. Tropez tan." The brand was discontinued in December 2019.

Products
The brand is known for low-SPF products that are typically marketed to women seeking skin tanning.

Current product lineup includes:
Orange Gelée SPF 4
Spray Transpâre SPF 10
Mega Tan SPF 4

History
According to the website:

In the 1920s, the famous, trend-setting Coco Chanel, sporting deeply sun-bronzed skin, turned tanning into a fashion statement.  In 1925, capitalizing on this fashion trend, Monsieur Antonine of Paris developed an Orange Gelée dark tanning formula called "Antoine de Paris".  The Orange Gelée formula continued to thrive in Europe into the 1940s when Lanvin, a New York based company introduced the silky sensuous gel in the United States as Antoine's Bain de Soleil...translated as Antoine's bath of the sun.

The Bain de Soleil brand transitioned from Procter & Gamble (P&G) to Pfizer in August 1995. The product recipes and certain pieces of manufacturing and packaging equipment were relocated from Hatboro, PA (P&G) to Pfizer Consumer Healthcare Group in Parsippany, New Jersey around October 1995. From November 1995 to 1999, the product was manufactured and packaged at the Pfizer CHCG 100 Jefferson Road, Parsippany, NJ site. During this time, the brand saw the largest portfolio enlargement, including self-tanning (sunless) and after-sun products. These products were all formulated at the same Pfizer site at the 400 Webro Road laboratories. Between 1995 and 1999, the following Bain de Soleil products were marketed:

 Sandbuster Sand-Resistant Oil SPF 2
 Tropical Deluxe SPF 4
 Mega-Tan SPF 4
 Mademoiselle SPF 4
 Mademoiselle SPF 8
 Mademoiselle SPF 15
 All Day SPF 4
 All Day SPF 8
 All Day SPF 15
 All Day SPF 30
 All Day Kids SPF 30
 All Day Gentle Block SPF 30
 SPF + Color SPF 8 - line renamed to "Sunless Tanning Creme with Sunblock"
 SPF + Color SPF 15
 SPF + Color SPF 30 
 Sunless Light
 Sunless Dark
 Sunless Deep Dark
 Sunless Tanning Spray Dark
 Sunless Tanning Spray Deep Dark
 Apres Soleil After Sun Revitalizing Aloe Mist
 Apres Soleil After Sun Moisture Replenishing Lotion
 Orange Gelee SPF 4
 Orange Gelee SPF 8
 Orange Gelee SPF 15
 Orange Gelee SPF 30
 Ecran Solaire SPF 15 - Canada
 Ecran Solaire SPF 30 Kids - Canada

Product development scientists at Pfizer CHCG were John A. Scott (group manager), Alice Scheiner (after sun and high-SPF products), Eric M. Stroud (sunless products), Judy Meyer, Andrew Ortega, and Mary Williams (packaging). Two innovations in 1,3-dihydroxyacetone stability were invented during this time. The entire brand was eventually divested on October 7, 1999 to Schering-Plough.

See also
Coppertone (sunscreen)

References

External links
Bain de Soleil

Cosmetics brands
Personal care brands
Sunscreen brands
Schering-Plough brands
Merck & Co. brands
American brands
Bayer brands